Sofia Gadegaard Shah (born 9 August 1997) is a Nepalese swimmer, who has represented Nepal since 2013. In 2014, she was nominated in the Popular Player of the Year category of the Pulsar Sports Awards.

Early life and education
Shah was born in Copenhagen, Denmark, but was raised from a young age in Kathmandu, Nepal with her family. She has a Nepali father and Danish mother. She attended Lincoln School from 2000-2015 and swam for the high school SAISA team. Shah was awarded the U.S. Presidential Award for Outstanding Academic Achievement in 2009, 2010, 2011, 2012, 2013, 2014 and 2015. In May 2015, she was awarded a FINA one-year "Road to Rio" scholarship to train in Thanyapura Phuket, Thailand. Shah attended the College of William and Mary for her first year of college, and then transferred to Pepperdine University.

Swimming career 
Shah has won a total of 102 gold national medals, along with 35 silver and 22 bronze medals.

She competed in the 50 m and 200 m freestyle events at the 2013 World Aquatics Championships. Shah set a new national record in heat rounds of the women's 200 meter freestyle during the 16th FINA World Championship in Kazan, Russia. She finished in 60th place among 63 participants, completing the distance in 2 minutes 18.93 seconds.

Shah entered finals in all her events at the 12th South Asian Games 2016 in Guwahati, India. This was the first international meet in which she qualified for finals.

She has represented Nepal at:
 15th FINA World Championships 2013 - Barcelona, Spain
 4th FINA Junior World Championships 2013 - Dubai, U.A.E.
 17th Asian Games 2014 - Incheon, Korea
 12th FINA World Championships (25m) 2014 - Doha, Qatar
 16th FINA World Championships 2015 - Kazan, Russia
 8th Asian Age Group Swimming Championships 2015 - Bangkok, Thailand
 FINA/Airweave Swimming World Cup 2015 - Dubai, U.A.E.
 12th South Asian Games 2016 - Guwahati, India
 Thailand Age Group Swimming Championships 2016 - Bangkok, Thailand

Personal records

Shah currently holds the Nepalese national records in the 50m freestyle, 200m freestyle and 400m Individual Medley.

References

Living people
1997 births
Nepalese female swimmers
Danish female freestyle swimmers
Swimmers at the 2014 Asian Games
Swimmers from Copenhagen
Nepalese female freestyle swimmers
Asian Games competitors for Nepal
21st-century Nepalese women
21st-century Danish women